Apple Valley Unified School District is a school district in San Bernardino County, California.

Schools 
The school district has 16 total active schools:
 Academy for Academic Excellence
 Apple Valley Adult Education
 Apple Valley High
 Apple Valley Unified Preschool Special Education
 Desert Knolls Elementary
 Granite Hills High
 High Desert Premier Academy
 Mariana Academy
 Phoenix Academy
 Rancho Verde Elementary
 Rio Vista School of Applied Learning
 Sandia Elementary
 Sitting Bull Academy
 Sycamore Rocks Elementary
 Vanguard Preparatory
 Yucca Loma Elementary

Statistics 
In the 2015–16 school year, the school district had a total of 852 students who could have graduated that year. Among those students, 747 graduated with a high school diploma. This makes the school district's graduation rate 87.7%.

References

External links 
 

School districts in San Bernardino County, California